Taleb Larbi is a town and commune, and capital of Taleb Larbi District, El Oued Province, Algeria. According to the 2008 census it has a population of 7,074, up from 3,582 in 1998, with an annual of growth rate of 7.2% per year, the second highest in the province.

Transportation
Taleb Larbi is just  from the border with Tunisia along the N48. To the west, the N48 meets the N16, which leads west to El Oued and Touggourt and north to Tébessa.

Climate

Taleb Larbi has a hot desert climate (Köppen climate classification BWh), with very hot summers and mild winters, and very little precipitation throughout the year.

Education

1.6% of the population has a tertiary education (the second lowest rate in the province), and another 18.2% has completed secondary education. The overall literacy rate is 61.6%, and is 68.9% among males and 53.0% among females.

Localities
The commune of Taleb Larbi is composed of 12 localities:

Taleb Larbi
Nakhlat El Mengoub
Hniche
Lemdjebès
Si Mebarek
Zeïdi
Garet Ettir
Laouabed
Maleh El Hadj Ahmed
Gour Djouali
Bouras
Sagaa

References

Neighbouring towns and cities

Communes of El Oued Province
Algeria–Tunisia border crossings
Cities in Algeria
Algeria